Taylor Creek is a census-designated place (CDP) in Okeechobee County, Florida, United States. The population was 4,348 at the 2010 census.

Geography
The community lies along the north side of Lake Okeechobee. The area is served by US routes 98 and 441 and state routes 700 and 15.

History
In 1855, Taylor Creek was the site for a meeting of Seminole. The aim of the meeting was to discuss how the confederation should respond to increasing pressure from the United States government, and the result was the start of the Third Seminole War.

In October 1896, the first Euro-American settlers, Peter and Louisiana Raulerson, moved down to the area from Fort Basinger, Florida.

Demographics

As of the census of 2000, there were 4,289 people, 2,022 households, and 1,277 families residing in the CDP. The racial makeup of the CDP was 94.54% White, 0.26% African American, 0.42% Native American, 0.61% Asian, 0.05% Pacific Islander, 3.12% from other races, and 1.00% from two or more races. Hispanic or Latino of any race were 5.15% of the population.

There were 2,022 households, out of which 14.7% had children under the age of 18 living with them, 52.4% were married couples living together, 6.6% had a female householder with no husband present, and 36.8% were non-families. 29.6% of all households were made up of individuals, and 16.2% had someone living alone who was 65 years of age or older.  The average household size was 2.12 and the average family size was 2.54.

In the CDP, the population was spread out, with 14.6% under the age of 18, 5.9% from 18 to 24, 18.2% from 25 to 44, 28.1% from 45 to 64, and 33.1% who were 65 years of age or older.  The median age was 55 years. For every 100 females, there were 103.5 males.  For every 100 females age 18 and over, there were 101.0 males.

The median income for a household in the CDP was $24,919, and the median income for a family was $28,260. Males had a median income of $23,810 versus $22,500 for females. The per capita income for the CDP was $16,754.  About 10.1% of families and 15.2% of the population were below the poverty line, including 22.8% of those under age 18 and 6.2% of those age 65 or over.

References

Census-designated places in Okeechobee County, Florida
Census-designated places in Florida
Populated places on Lake Okeechobee